Temburong District (Jawi: دائيره تمبوروڠ) or simply Temburong is the easternmost district in Brunei. It is an exclave — the land is separated from the rest of the country by Malaysia and Brunei Bay, and accessible from the mainland via the Sultan Haji Omar Ali Saifuddien Bridge. The population was 10,251 in 2016; it is the least populous district in the country. Bangar is the district town and administrative centre.

Geography
The district is surrounded by Brunei Bay to the north and Sarawak, Malaysia to the east, south and west.

The Temburong River flows through the district, and the Sungai Pandaruan river forms the western section of the border with Malaysia.

It is also the highest point in the country.

Brunei's first national park, the Ulu Temburong National Park, is located south of the Temburong district, covering  of the Temburong forest. The national park has a scientific research centre facility, the Kuala Belalong Rainforest Field Studies Centre, which is only accessible by boat.  
 of the Kuala Belalong area had been allocated for joint venture research projects conducted by the Universiti Brunei Darussalam, Kuala Belalong Field Studies and the Smithsonian Tropical Research Institute. It is called the "Belalong Rainforest Experience," and is funded by The Hongkong and Shanghai Banking Corporation: Brunei. An Outward Bound centre can also be found within the national park.

Temburong has  of roads connecting Bangar to interior villages. In addition a further  of roads connect villages in the interior.

A new  roadway connecting the Muara and Temburong districts of Brunei was completed in March 2020.  of this roadway crosses the Brunei Bay.

Administration 

The district administration is the responsibility of Temburong District Office, a government department under the Ministry of Home Affairs.

Temburong District is divided into five mukims:

 Mukim Amo
 Mukim Bangar
 Mukim Batu Apoi
 Mukim Bokok
 Mukim Labu

These are further subdivided into 76 Kampongs (Villages), however only 57 have a permanent population.

According to the Constitution, the district is to be represented in the Legislative Council, the state legislature, by up to 2 members. As of 2017, one member has been appointed to represent the district in the legislature.

Demographics 

Temburong District is the least populous district in Brunei. In terms of professed religions,  were Muslims,  were Christians,  were Buddhists, and  professed other than the aforementioned religions or irreligious.

The census also recorded 2,007 households living in 1,894 dwellings in the district.

In 2020, the district's population was estimated to have increased to 11,200.

Tourism 

Much of the district is still covered by trees. This leads to the intensive development of the eco-tourism industry in Temburong district. Eco-Tourism promotion events such as "Cuti-Cuti Temburong" ('Temburong holidays') was launched at the end of 2008 by the local tourism group known as "Kenali Negara Kitani" (KNK) ('Know Your Country') to encourage locals and tourists from foreign countries to travel to the Temburong district. The promotion event is a kick-start of the Heart of Borneo project at Brunei vicinity.

Infrastructures

Education 

In 2019, there were 14 schools in Temburong District under the Ministry of Education, out of which 12 were government and 2 were private. For the formal Islamic religious education which is under the Ministry of Religious Affairs, there were 12 religious schools ( of the country's total), employing 106 teachers and enrolling 770 students.

The highest education level available is secondary and provided at Sultan Hassan Secondary School, the sole secondary school in the district.

Healthcare 
Pengiran Isteri Hajjah Mariam Hospital is the district hospital. It was inaugurated on 3 September 1987. The construction cost B$15 million; it sits on a  site. The hospital has 50 beds and the clinical services provided include maternity, dental, optical and intensive care units.

Roads 

The road network is connected to the rest of the country primarily via Sultan Haji Omar Ali Saifuddien Bridge, commonly known as Temburong Bridge, which traverses the Labu Forest Reserve and the Brunei Bay. The other end of the bridge terminates in Brunei-Muara District. There is also the alternative road which crosses the Brunei–Malaysia border and is through the Limbang District in the Malaysian state of Sarawak. Prior to the opening of the bridge in 2020, the route which passes through Malaysia was the only land route to the rest of the country.

Security
The district has an army presence at Bangar Camp. There is one main police headquarters in Bangar and numerous police posts around the district.

Use by SAF

The SAF Commandos regularly conducts jungle training here. A Singapore army camp is also located in between Kampung Negalang and the other town that is called the Lakiun.

Notes

References 
R. Hédl, M. Svátek, M. Dancak, Rodzay A.W., M. Salleh A.B., Kamariah A.S. A new technique for inventory of permanent plots in tropical forests: a case study from lowland dipterocarp forest in Kuala Belalong, Brunei Darussalam, In Blumea 54, 2009, p 124–130. Publié 30. 10. 2009.

External links

 Temburong District Office website (Malay)

 
Districts of Brunei
Enclaves and exclaves
Brunei–Malaysia border